Neptosternus taprobanicus, is a species of predaceous diving beetle found in Sri Lanka.

Description
This long oval beetle has a body size of about 3 mm. Head and pronotum testaceous with a narrow dark-brown band found at the posterior margin of the pronotum. Pronotum yellowish with some darkened areas along anterior and posterior margins. Pronotal length is 2.6 to 3.7 mm. Elytral length is about 3.0 to 3.1 mm. Elytra dark brown in color with a testaceous lateral margin. Elytron with two separate subbasal yellow spots. The median and apical spots are distinctly connected along the lateral border. Elytral median presuturai yellow spot confluent with other yellow markings laterally, conjointly forming a more or less transverse spot.

References 

Dytiscidae
Insects of Sri Lanka
Insects described in 1973